The Blacklist: Redemption is an American crime thriller television series that aired on NBC from February 23 to April 13, 2017. A spin-off from the NBC series The Blacklist, The Blacklist: Redemption stars Famke Janssen as Susan Scott "Scottie" Hargrave, president of Halcyon Aegis, a private military company with teams of corporate operatives, and Ryan Eggold as Tom Keen. Eggold appeared in The Blacklist and returned to it after completing his role in The Blacklist: Redemption. After an episode of The Blacklist served as a backdoor pilot, the new series was ordered by NBC in May 2016. NBC cancelled the series after one season on May 12, 2017 due to low ratings.

Premise 
The Blacklist: Redemption focuses on secret agent Tom Keen and his mother, Susan Hargrave, who runs Halcyon, a covert mercenary organization. While investigating cases, Tom learns that his father, Howard, is alive, which leads Tom to discoveries about his past and the rivalry between Susan and Howard, discoveries that force Tom to choose a side.

Cast

Main 
 Famke Janssen as Susan Scott "Scottie" Hargrave, head of Halcyon Aegis' Grey Matters branch, a covert mercenary organization.
 Ryan Eggold as Tom Keen, Scottie's son, and a skilled secret agent.
 Edi Gathegi as Matias Solomon, a mercenary.
 Tawny Cypress as Nez Rowan, a mercenary.
 Adrian Martinez as Dumont, a brilliant computer hacker.

Recurring 
 Terry O'Quinn as Howard Hargrave, founder of Halcyon Aegis, and Tom Keen's father.
 Theodora Miranne as Kat Carlson, Scottie's personal assistant.
 Dan Amboyer as Daniel / "Trevor", the much younger male prostitute Scottie visits, who eventually starts a relationship with Kat.

Additionally, The Blacklist stars Megan Boone and Harry Lennix made guest appearances during the season.

Production

Development 
In March 2016, NBC began developing a spin-off series created by The Blacklist creator Jon Bokenkamp and showrunner John Eisendrath, who would both executive produce with John Davis and John Fox, the rest of their team from the original series. The project stars Famke Janssen as Susan "Scottie" Hargrave and Ryan Eggold reprising his role as Tom Keen, and was conceived to highlight a similar dynamic between Scottie and Tom to what Raymond "Red" Reddington (James Spader) has to Liz Keen (Megan Boone) on The Blacklist. Additionally, Janssen first appeared in the role in The Blacklist episode "Susan Hargrave" in May, with the following episode, "Alexander Kirk", serving as a backdoor pilot for the potential series. The new series, named The Blacklist: Redemption, was ordered on May 14. In October, David Amann was named the series' showrunner and executive producer. The series aired on Thursdays at 10 p.m., the same slot its mother series had for its fourth season. On May 12, 2017, NBC canceled the series after one season and Eggold returned to his role on The Blacklist. The Hollywood Reporter reported that the network made this decision following the first season's disappointed ratings compared to The Blacklist.

Casting 
The cast of The Blacklist: Redemption included Famke Janssen as Susan Hargrave, Ryan Eggold as Tom Keen, Edi Gathegi as Matias Solomon, and Tawny Cypress as Nez Rowan. Adrian Martinez was added in a recurring role as computer hacker Dumont. Eggold was having a main role on the original series, and was mostly absent from the show's fourth season due to filming a spin-off. The rest of the actors previously guest-starred on Blacklist, being introduced in the third season.

Terry O'Quinn was cast as Howard Hargrave, Tom's father, in a recurring role. Additional recurring characters in the series include Theodora Miranne as Kat Carlson, and Dan Amboyer as Daniel / "Trevor". Boone and Harry Lennix reprised their Blacklist roles as Elizabeth Keen and Harold Cooper, respectively, in the series. Showrunners reported it was highly unlikely for James Spader to reprise his role of Raymond Reddington, the original series’ titular character, in the first season of the spin-off; however, he could appear later in the series.

Episodes

Reception

Ratings 
The series premiere drew in 4.2 million viewers, with a Nielsen rating of 0.8 among adults aged 18–49. The series averaged 6.3 million viewers and a rating of 1.2, making it the third lowest rated NBC series that year after Emerald City and Powerless.

Critical reception 
The Blacklist: Redemption did not receive enough critical reviews to have a score on either Rotten Tomatoes or Metacritic. In her review of the first episode, Sonia Saraiya of Variety wrote that she did not find the charisma of the series’ three main actors to equal that of The Blacklists James Spader, while Jodi Walker of Entertainment Weekly wrote that the season was a satisfying foundation on which to create what she hoped would be better seasons.

Ratings

References

External links 
 
 

2010s American crime drama television series
2017 American television series debuts
2017 American television series endings
American action television series
American television spin-offs
English-language television shows
NBC original programming
Television series by Universal Television
Television series by Sony Pictures Television
Television series created by John Eisendrath
Television shows filmed in New York (state)
Redemption
Works about computer hacking